The Silver Horde is a 1920 American silent adventure-drama film directed by Frank Lloyd and starring Myrtle Stedman, Curtis Cooksey, and Betty Blythe. It is based on the 1909 novel The Silver Horde by Rex Beach.

Premise
A young man goes to Alaska to establish a salmon business.

Cast
 Myrtle Stedman as Cherry Malotté  
 Curtis Cooksey as Boyd Emerson  
 Betty Blythe as Mildred Wayland  
 R.D. MacLean as Wayne Wayland  
 Robert McKim as Marsh 
 Hector V. Sarno as Constantine  
 Louis Durham as Swanson  
 Maurice 'Lefty' Flynn as Thug  
 Neola May as Snowbird  
 Ervin Denecke as Thug  
 Fred R. Stanton as Big George Bolt  
 Carl Gerard as Alton Clyde  
 Murdock MacQuarrie as Richard Jones

Preservation status
 This film is listed as surviving and preserved by MGM.

References

Bibliography
 Goble, Alan. The Complete Index to Literary Sources in Film. Walter de Gruyter, 1999.

External links

 
 
 
 

1920 films
1920 adventure films
American adventure drama films
American silent feature films
Films directed by Frank Lloyd
Films set in Alaska
Films about fishing
American black-and-white films
Films based on works by Rex Beach
Goldwyn Pictures films
1920s English-language films
1920s American films
Silent adventure drama films
1920s adventure drama films